Everton Gonçalves Saturnino (born 5 February 1990) in Cascavel, simply known as Everton, is a Brazilian footballer who plays for Bangkok United as a centre-back.

Career

Career statistics

Honours

Club
Lajeadense
Copa FGF: 2014

Luverdense
Campeonato Mato-Grossense: 2016

Chiangrai United
 Thai FA Cup (1): 2017

References

External links
 

1990 births
Living people
Brazilian footballers
Association football defenders
Everton Goncalves Saturnino
Everton Goncalves Saturnino
Luverdense Esporte Clube players
São José Esporte Clube players
Toledo Esporte Clube players
Clube Esportivo Lajeadense players
Atlético Clube Paranavaí players